Tecla Insolia (born 13 January 2004) is an Italian actress and singer.

Biography 
Born in Varese, she grew up in Piombino, Tuscany.

She took part in several Italian TV shows such as Pequeños gigantes (2016) and L'allieva (2018).

On 15 March 2019 she won the second edition of RAI's talent show Sanremo Young, gaining participation to the Sanremo Music Festival 2020. She competed in the "Newcomers" section of the Sanremo Festival with the song "8 marzo" and ended up second to Leo Gassmann's "Vai bene così".  She won the "Enzo Jannacci" Award for Best Performance and the Press, Radio, TV & Web Award "Lucio Dalla".

In 2020, she starred in the thriller TV series Vite in fuga, broadcast on Rai 1. She also portrayed Nada in the television biopic La bambina che non voleva cantare.

Discography

Singles

Filmography

Film 
 La bambina che non voleva cantare (2021) – TV film
 Addio al nubilato (2021)
 Purché finisca bene 5: Tutta colpa della fata Morgana (2021) – TV film

TV series 
 L'allieva (2018)
 Vite in fuga (2020)
 5 minuti prima (2022)

References

Italian pop singers
Living people
21st-century Italian singers
2004 births
People from Piombino
Actors from Varese
21st-century Italian women singers
Musicians from Varese
People of Sicilian descent